Mohamed Thiaw (born January 24, 1995) is a Senegalese soccer player.

Career

College 
Born in Dakar, Senegal, Thiaw moved to Lexington, Kentucky as a 15-year-old where he attended Bryan Station High School and after graduation attended Cincinnati State Technical and Community College, where he played OCCAC soccer for two seasons and scored 41 goals in 34 appearances. He was a two-time All-America selection for his performances at Cincinnati State.

Thiaw transferred to the University of Louisville in 2016 and played for the Cardinals for two seasons, scoring 20 goals in 41 appearances.

Professional
On January 10, 2018, Thiaw was selected 35th overall by the San Jose Earthquakes during the 2018 MLS SuperDraft. He was officially signed by the club on March 1, 2018, and immediately sent on loan to San Jose's USL affiliate Reno 1868 FC, alongside fellow SuperDraft pick Danny Musovski. Thiaw made his first professional appearance on March 24, 2018, as a 77th minute substitution for Brian Brown during Reno's 1-1 draw with Las Vegas Lights FC.

Thiaw was released by San Jose at the end of their 2018 season.

Indoor
In March 2021, Thiaw joined Metro Louisville FC of the Premier Arena Soccer League ahead of the 2020–21 National Tournament.

Career Statistics

Honors

Collegiate
 2015 Junior College Player of the Year
 2016 NSCAA All-South Region Second Team
 2016 TopDrawerSoccer.com Best XI Second Team
 2016 All-ACC First Team
 2017 All-ACC Second Team

Club
 2019 NPSL National Champion
 2019 NISA East Coast Championship

References

External links

UofL bio

1995 births
Living people
American soccer players
Association football forwards
Louisville Cardinals men's soccer players
Major League Soccer players
Portland Timbers U23s players
Reno 1868 FC players
San Jose Earthquakes draft picks
San Jose Earthquakes players
Miami FC players
Senegalese emigrants to the United States
Soccer players from Kentucky
Sportspeople from Lexington, Kentucky
USL Championship players
USL League Two players
National Independent Soccer Association players